Brother, Sister is the third studio album by indie rock band mewithoutYou, released on September 26, 2006 through Tooth & Nail Records.  It features guest vocal and instrumental appearances by several artists, including Jeremy Enigk (of Sunny Day Real Estate), harpist Timbre,  and members of Anathallo and the Psalters. From August 9, 2007, Burnt Toast Vinyl were taking pre-orders for an LP-format version of the album. The album features an abundance of symbolism, much of which is tied to animals; at least one can be found in the lyrics of each track.

Brother, Sister reached a peak position of number 116 on the Billboard 200 on October 14, 2006.

The cover art is by artist Vasily Kafanov.

The album's title comes from a verse in the Bhagavad Gita.

Track listing

Personnel 
 Greg Jehanian – bass, background vocals
 Christopher Kleinberg – guitar, background vocals
 Richard Mazzotta – drums, percussion
 Aaron Weiss – lead vocals, spoken word
 Michael Weiss – guitar, background vocals
 Josh Bender – background vocals
 Andrew Dost – flugelhorn
 Jeremy Enigk – vocals
 Orlando Greenhill – upright bass
 Timbre – harp
 Bret Wallin – trombone
 Chick Wolverton – melodica
 Brad Wood – melodica

Technical personnel 
 Michael Almquist - Spider song sequencer
 Chris Crisman – photography
 Chad Johnson – A&R
 Emily Lazar – mastering
 Jason Powers – art direction, design, illustrations
 Brad Wood – producer, engineer, mixing

References

External links
 

2006 albums
MewithoutYou albums
Tooth & Nail Records albums
Albums produced by Brad Wood